(), known as just Le Massif, is a ski area in Quebec, Canada, northeast of Quebec City and directly overlooking the St. Lawrence River.

Description 
 ski area is located in Petite-Rivière-Saint-François, Charlevoix, Quebec, 90 km northeast of Quebec City. It is one of the few ski areas that is accessible from both the base and summit.

Skiing season usually lasts from early December to late April. While the snow pack at the summit can exceed  in a typical winter, the base is near sea level and can quickly begin to melt by April.

La Charlevoix, the steepest trail with a pitch of 64%, is home to the only alpine training center east of the Rockies for Canada's athletes.

The resort stretches from the top of the escarpment (actually a half-graben) to the bottom, where the Saint Lawrence River flows past.

History 
Skiing at  started at the end of the 1970s, with snowmobiles towing groups of skiers from the main road at the top and a van serving as the lift. In the early 1980s, commercial operations started with la Société de développement du Massif.  Starting in 1983–1984, school buses were used to drive skiers from the base to the top after each run. In the summer of 1992, two chairlifts were installed: a high-speed quad and a fixed-grip double.

A new road was built from Route 138 to the top of the mountain. The distance between Quebec City and  summit was then reduced to  instead of the  previously needed to reach the base via the village of Petite-Rivière-Saint-François. It hosted the speed events of the 2006 Junior World Championships, with technical events at Mont-Sainte-Anne. However, La Charlevoix was deemed unsuitable for hosting an Olympic downhill men’s event, hurting Quebec City's chances at hosting a Winter Olympics. The Junior Worlds returned in 2013.

Though the ski area carried out substantial new development in coordination with the train, such as a hotel in Baie-Saint-Paul with a private rail spur for shuttle service, and a pulse gondola shuttle from the lower mountain to the rail station in Petite-Rivière-Saint-François, the winter trains failed to attract enough passengers to prove economical and were terminated after the 2014-2015 season.  Train service now operates from June to October.

Development 
 is about to undertake a major development known as Territoire Le Massif. This will open up the third peak to skiing, but mostly transform the mountain and surrounding area into a distinctive four-seasons resort, while respecting environmental values.

The project has a budget of about C$180 million in new investments, in addition to the $50 million already spent, and comprises three parts:

 La Ferme (The Farm): Hotel, services and activities in Baie-Saint-Paul, on the site of a burned-out farm. Opening in June 2012, it was awarded first prize in the Hotel and Service Retail Category of the Retail and Leisure Interior awards in March 2013. 

See also
 Charlevoix Railway
 Charlevoix tourist train
 Groupe Le Massif Inc.
 List of ski areas and resorts in Canada
 Mont-Sainte-Anne
 Stoneham Mountain Resort

References

External links

 
Article at First Tracks!! Online Ski Magazine

Ski areas and resorts in Quebec
Landforms of Capitale-Nationale
Tourist attractions in Capitale-Nationale